Powers & Perils (P&P) is a role-playing game written by Richard Snider and published by Avalon Hill in 1983 as a boxed set.

History
Powers & Perils (1984) by Richard Snider was scheduled to be released at Origins 1983, but the demonstration rooms in which the game was supposed to have appeared were instead left empty, and the game was eventually published early in 1984. Powers & Perils was published by Avalon Hill as a boxed set containing five books (60 pages, 52 pages, 52 pages, 44 pages, and 24 pages respectively), a pad of character sheets, and dice. Avalon Hill's house organ magazine Heroes supported Powers & Perils and the company's other role-playing lines.

Products
Powers & Perils is an exceedingly detailed fantasy system, with skill-based character abilities and a spell-point magic system. There are five rulebooks: the 44-page "The Character Book" covers character creation, skills, and experience; the 52-page "The Combat and Magic Book" covers combat rules, movement, magic, and spells; the 60-page "The Creature Book" describes the surface and underworld, encounter tables, and fantastic creatures; the 52-page "The Book of Human Encounters and Treasure" covers NPCs, treasure, and magic items; and the 24-page "County Mordara" is an introductory scenario.

A second boxed set contained information on the world, named Perilous Lands, in the form of three books: "The Map Book", "Sites of Power", and "The Culture Book". Subsequent expansions were printed in Heroes magazine and an adventure for high-level characters, Tower of the Dead, was released in 1984.

Tower of the Dead

Tower of the Dead is the only adventure published for Powers & Perils. Tower of the Dead is a boxed set that contains a 56-page adventure book, and a cardstock gamemaster's screen. Through a four-part adventure, the player characters become aware that the lich Nilgeranthrib seeks to become ruler of Thaliba, and they must endeavor to destroy him. The four parts of the adventure take place in the city of Porta, near the city, on the road, and in the Tower of the Dead for the final confrontation with the lich.

The adventure was a boxed set designed by Richard Snider, with artwork by Rick Barber, Winchell Chung, Michael Creager, and Bob Haynes.

Legacy
Powers & Perils was a failure for Avalon Hill, despite their reputation for quality productions; this failure was attributed by Shannon Appelcline to the company's inexperience in the role-playing game field. Powers & Perils included  several drawings plagiarized from artist Frank Frazetta. Avalon Hill had no previous experience with role-playing games, being primarily a producer of strategy and war games such as Tactics II, Blitzkrieg and Squad Leader, and Powers & Perils died before its time. Overpricing and strong competition from the first edition Dungeons & Dragons saw P&P on store shelves at two to three times the price being asked for its contemporaries.

Due to the failure of Powers & Perils, Avalon Hill only published a few supplements in 1984 and discontinued the line.

Reception
In the September 1984 edition of White Dwarf (Issue #57), Adrian Knowles gave it an overall rating of 8 out of 10, saying, "Overall, P&P introduces some nice ideas which can be adapted readily into other systems. The game is more suited to experienced players and GMs since it is fairly complex. In general, a greater amount of work than is normal for an RPG is needed for playing Powers and Perils, but it is a good system."

In the October 1984 edition of Imagine (Issue 19), Mike Dean stated that "I have my doubts as to whether P&P will make it as a widely popular RPG, but I am sure it will gain a considerable and well-deserved following."

In the January–February 1985 edition of Different Worlds (Issue #38), Troy Christensen was unimpressed, giving the game a below-average rating of 1.5 stars out of 4, and saying that the game "is lost in the limbo somewhere between the complexity of Chivalry & Sorcery and the simplicity of Dungeons & Dragons." Christensen found issues with character generation, which he said: "takes about ten times longer than most fantasy games." He then found combat too simplistic, and commented that "With a combination of simplicity and complexity mixed so unequally and haphazardly, the game seems ungainly and plays roughly." He concluded with a negative recommendation, saying, "Powers & Perils to me adds nothing beyond what I have found in other more established games."

In issue 24 of Imagine, Mike Dean noted the relatively high price of Tower of the Dead, but still recommended it, saying "Tower of the Dead is a formidable challenge to any experienced group of P&P players and is recommended in spite of what may seem to be a high price."

In a retrospective review in 1996, Rick Swan recalled that Powers & Perils had  been the second-worst game he'd ever played, calling it an "incomprehensible role-playing game."

Other reviews
Fantasy Gamer #6

References

External links
 Powers and Perils (Unofficial Website)

Avalon Hill games
Fantasy role-playing games
Role-playing games introduced in 1984